The Mind Parasites is a science fiction horror novel by English author Colin Wilson.  It was published by Arkham House in 1967 in an edition of 3,045 copies.  It was Wilson's first and only book published by Arkham House.

The book is based on H. P. Lovecraft's Cthulhu Mythos.

Publication history
In his introduction to The Philosopher's Stone (1969), Wilson explained how he wrote The Mind Parasites at the urging of August Derleth. Wilson had earlier written an essay explaining his admiration for Lovecraft as a thinker or conceptualist, while also expressing a dislike for Lovecraft's prose as ungainly and ponderous. Derleth replied to Wilson, offering a friendly challenge to write a narrative exploring Lovecraft's themes. Wilson took up the challenge, and Derleth published the first American edition of The Philosopher's Stone.

The novel was published earlier in 1967 by Arthur Barker (London), but with a different introduction.  It was then reprinted by Oneiric Press (Berkeley,CA) from 1972 to 1975, initially by Michael Besher (aka Misha PanZobop; Paris, France) and Chellis Glendinning; then by Besher and his brother Alexander Besher.

In 1994, the first Russian translation of the book was published by a Ukrainian publishing house Sofia, with 20,000 copies printed.

Plot summary 
The story is about Professor Gilbert Austin's conflict with the Tsathogguans, invisible mind parasites that menace the most brilliant people on earth.

Critical reception 
Reviewing The Mind Parasites for The Magazine of Fantasy & Science Fiction, Joanna Russ gave the book a negative assessment. Russ stated "the Outsider's latest is not in the Lovecraft tradition but in the Boy's Life Gee Whiz tradition, and ought to be called "Tom Swift and the Tsathogguans."" Russ said the book would disappoint Lovecraft enthusiasts, and called it "one of the worst books I have ever read and very enjoyable, but then I did not have to pay for it." David Pringle rated The Mind Parasites with one star out of four. Pringle described the novel as a "stilted version" of the traditional science fiction plot of humanity being controlled by invisible entities, and said The Mind Parasites "doesn't live up to the author's reputation gained in other fields."

Reprints 
New York: Bantam, 1968.
St. Albans, UK: Panther, 1969.
Berkeley, CA: Oneiric Press, 1972–1975.
Moscow: Raduga Publishers, 1986.

References

Sources 

1967 British novels
Cthulhu Mythos novels
1967 science fiction novels
Novels by Colin Wilson
British philosophical novels
Novels about telepathy
Arthur Barker Limited books